EPAD may refer to:
 Electricity Price Area Differential, a financial product
 a simple text editor written in Elementary and Python 
  (EPAD), a French public industrial and commercial establishment concerned with La Défense, a business district near Paris